Elections in the Republic of India in 2001 included elections to five state legislative assemblies and to seats in the Rajya Sabha.

Legislative Assembly elections

Assam

Kerala

Puducherry

Tamil Nadu

|-
! style="background-color:#E9E9E9;text-align:left;vertical-align:top;" |Alliance/Party
!style="width:4px" |
! style="background-color:#E9E9E9;text-align:right;" |Seats won
! style="background-color:#E9E9E9;text-align:right;" |Change
! style="background-color:#E9E9E9;text-align:right;" |Popular Vote
! style="background-color:#E9E9E9;text-align:right;" |Vote %
! style="background-color:#E9E9E9;text-align:right;" |Adj. %‡
|-
! style="background-color:#009900; color:white"|AIADMK+ alliance
! style="background-color: " |
| 196
| +138
| 14,043,980
|style="text-align:center;vertical-align:middle;" colspan=2 | 50.1%
|-
|AIADMK
! style="background-color: #008000" | 
| 132
| +127
| 8,815,387
| 31.4%
| 52.1%
|-
|TMC(M)
! style="background-color: #008080" |
| 23
| -15
| 1,885,726
| 6.7%
| 47.5%
|-
|PMK
! style="background-color: #800080" |
| 20
| +16
| 1,557,500
| 5.6%
| 46.8%
|-
|INC
! style="background-color: #00FFFF" |
| 7
| +7
| 696,205
| 2.5%
| 45.4%
|-
|CPI(M)
! style="background-color: #000080" |
| 6
| +4
| 470,736
| 1.7%
| 48.2%
|-
|CPI
! style="background-color: #0000FF" |
| 5
| -3
| 444,710
| 1.6%
| 48.5%
|-
|IND
! style="background-color: Black" |
| 2
| +2
| 103,971
| 0.4%
| 46.6%
|-
|AIFB
! style="background-color: #800000" |
| 1
| +1
| 39,248
| 0.1%
| 43.3%
|-
|MUL
! style="background-color: " |
| 0
| -1
| 30,497
| 0.1%
| 41.7%
|-
! style="background-color:#FF0000; color:white"|DMK+ alliance
! style="background-color: Red" |
| 37
| -138
| 10,841,157
|style="text-align:center;vertical-align:middle;" colspan=2 | 38.7%
|-
|DMK
! style="background-color: Red" |
| 31
| -142
| 8,669,864
| 30.9%
| 39.0%
|-
|BJP
! style="background-color: " |
| 4
| +3
| 895,352
| 3.2%
| 38.7%
|-
|MADMK
! style="background-color: #FFFF00" |
| 2
| +1
| 129,474
| 0.5%
| 37.1%
|-
|PT
! style="background-color: " |
| 0
| –
| 355,171
| 1.3%
| 33.8%
|-
|MTD
! style="background-color: " |
| 0
| –
| 257,126
| 0.9%
| 40.9%
|-
|PNK
! style="background-color: " |
| 0
| –
| 196,740
| 0.7%
| 33.6%
|-
|MGRK
! style="background-color: " |
| 0
| –
| 136,916
| 0.5%
| 40.8%
|-
|TB
! style="background-color: " |
| 0
| –
| 45,002
| 0.2%
| 40.0%
|-
|CNMK
! style="background-color: " |
| 0
| –
| 40,421
| 0.1%
| 32.4%
|-
|IND
! style="background-color: " |
| 0
| –
| 115,091
| 0.4%
| 36.7%
|-
! style="background-color:Black; color:white"|Others
! style="background-color: Black" |
| 1
| –
| 3,192,598
|style="text-align:center;vertical-align:middle;" colspan=2 |11.4%
|-
|MDMK
! style="background-color: " |
| 0
| –
| 1,304,469
| 4.7%
| 5.1%
|-
|IND
! style="background-color: #4d4d4d" |
| 1
| –
| 1,509,378
| 6.2%
| 6.3%
|-
| style="text-align:center;" |Total
! style="background-color: " |
| 234
| –
| 28,037,314
| 100%
| –
|-
|}
Note: Parties that contested under "rising-sun" or "two-leaves" symbol are listed as DMK or AIADMK respectively. Parties that ran their candidates as independents, (e.g. Indian Uzhavar Uzhaippalar Katchi and Thondar Congress in DMK alliance) are listed as IND for their respective alliance.
‡: Vote % reflects the percentage of votes the party received compared to the entire electorate that voted in this election. Adjusted (Adj.) Vote %, reflects the average % of votes the party received per constituency that they contested.
 Sources: Election Commission of India and Rediff Newspaper

West Bengal

|- align=center
!style="background-color:#E9E9E9" class="unsortable"|
!style="background-color:#E9E9E9" align=center|Political Party
!style="background-color:#E9E9E9" |No. of candidates
!style="background-color:#E9E9E9" |No. of elected
!style="background-color:#E9E9E9" |Number of Votes
!style="background-color:#E9E9E9" |% of Votes
!style="background-color:#E9E9E9" |Seat change
|-
| 
|align="left"|Communist Party of India (Marxist)||211||143||13,402,603||36.59%||
|-
| 
|align="left"|All India Trinamool Congress||226||60||11,229,396||30.66%||
|-
| 
|align="left"|Indian National Congress||60||26||2,921,151||7.98%||
|-
| 
|align="left"|All India Forward Bloc||34||25||2,067,944||5.65%||
|-
| 
|align="left"|Revolutionary Socialist Party||23||17||1,256,951||3.43%||
|-
| 
|align="left"|Communist Party of India||13||7||655,237||1.79%||
|-
| 
|align="left"|West Bengal Socialist Party||4||4||246,407||0.67%||
|-
| 
|align="left"|Gorkha National Liberation Front||5||3||190,057||0.52%||
|-
| 
|align="left"|Biplobi Bangla Congress||1||1||62,611||0.09%||
|-
| 
|align="left"|Independents||530||9||1,848,830||5.05%||
|-
|
|align="left"|Total||1676||294||36,626,099||||
|-
|}

Rajya Sabha

References

External Links
 

2001 elections in India
India
2001 in India
Elections in India by year